is a Japanese actress. She is best known for playing Yuka Sanada in Genseishin Justirisers.

Filmography
 Bayside Shakedown 2 (2003)
 Genseishin Justirisers (2004) - Yuka Sanada, Riser Kageri
Super Fleet Sazer-X the Movie: Fight! Star Soldiers (2005) - Yuka Sanada, Riser Kageri

Television
Toshiie and Matsu (2002) – Chacha
Genseishin Justirisers (2004–05) – Yuka Sanada

References

Living people
1987 births
Japanese actresses